Seltso is a rural locality (a village) in Prigorodnoye Rural Settlement, Sokolsky District, Vologda Oblast, Russia. The population was 19 as of 2002.

Geography 
Seltso is located 10 km southeast of Sokol (the district's administrative centre) by road. Sloboda is the nearest rural locality.

References 

Rural localities in Sokolsky District, Vologda Oblast